The 2010 Minnesota U.S. House of Representatives elections took place on November 2, 2010. All eight congressional seats that make up the state's delegation were contested. Representatives are elected for two-year terms; those elected will serve in the 112th United States Congress from January 3, 2011, until January 3, 2013.

The 2010 Minnesota gubernatorial, 2010 Minnesota House elections and 2010 Minnesota Senate elections occurred on the same date, as well as many local elections and ballot initiatives.

The 111th congressional delegation from the U.S. state of Minnesota had five Democratic Farmer Labor Party members (DFLers) and 3 Republicans. All the incumbents ran successfully for re-election, except District 8's Jim Oberstar, who was defeated in his bid for a 19th term. This left Minnesota with an even number of Democratic and Republican representatives.

Match-up summary

Overview

By district
Results of the 2010 United States House of Representatives elections in Minnesota by district:

District 1

Democrat Tim Walz ran for re-election, challenged by Republican nominee Randy Demmer, Independence Party candidate Steven Wilson, and Party Free candidate Lars Johnson. Walz won the general election on November 2, 2010, with 49% of the vote to Demmer's 44%. CQ Politics rated the seat as 'Leans Democratic'. No primary elections were held in the 1st congressional district in 2010.

General election

Polling

Results

External links
Steve Wilson campaign site
Lars Johnson campaign site
Race ranking and details from CQ Politics
Campaign contributions from OpenSecrets
Race Profile at The New York Times

District 2

Republican John Kline sought re-election to continue representing the 2nd district, which CQ Politics rated as 'Safe'. Kline won the general election on November 2, 2010, 63%-37%.

Democratic primary

Candidates
 Shelley Madore, former State Representative from district 37A (2007-2009)
 Dan Powers

Results

Republican primary

Candidates
 John Kline, incumbent U.S. Representative since 2003

Results

General Election

Results

External links
Race ranking and details from CQ Politics
Campaign contributions from OpenSecrets
Race Profile at The New York Times

District 3

Republican Erik Paulsen ran for re-election in the 3rd congressional district, which CQ Politics rated as 'Safe Republican'. Paulsen won the general election on November 2, 2010, 59%-37%. No primary elections were held in the 3rd congressional district in 2010.

General Election

Results

External links
Race ranking and details from CQ Politics
Campaign contributions from OpenSecrets
Race Profile at The New York Times

District 4

Democrat Betty McCollum ran for re-election in the 4th congressional district, which CQ Politics rated as 'Safe'. McCollum won the general election on November 2, 2010, 59%-35%.

Democratic primary

Candidates
Diana Longrie, former Mayor of Maplewood (2005-2009)
 Betty McCollum, incumbent U.S. Representative since 2001

Results

Independence Party primary

Candidates
 Steve Carlson

Results

Republican primary

Candidates
 Teresa Collett, law professor at the University of St. Thomas
 Jack Shepard, fugitive, alleged arsonist, and former Minneapolis dentist who fled the country after allegedly attempting to burn down his own dental office

Results

General election

Results

External links
Race ranking and details from CQ Politics
Campaign contributions from OpenSecrets
Race Profile at The New York Times

District 5

Democrat Keith Ellison ran for re-election in the 5th district, which CQ Politics rated as 'Safe'. Ellison is the first Muslim to be elected to the United States Congress. Ellison won the general election on November 2, 2010, 68%-24%.

Democratic primary

Candidates
 Keith Ellison, incumbent U.S. Representative since 2007
 Gregg A. Iverson
 Barb Davis White, minister, author, and civil rights activist

Results

Independence Party primary

Candidates
 Tom Schrunk

Results

Republican primary

Candidates
 Joel Demos

Results

General election

Results

External links
Race ranking and details from CQ Politics
Campaign contributions from OpenSecrets
Race Profile at The New York Times

District 6

Democrat Tarryl Clark, the state Senate assistant majority leader, received the endorsement of the DFL Party and was the sole Democratic challenger to Bachmann's seat, Maureen Reed having dropped out of the race in June 2010. Reed, a former University of Minnesota regent chair and a physician, threw her support behind Clark saying she felt "it is time for the DFL to unify behind one candidate in this race". Independence Party candidate Bob Anderson and independent Aubrey Immelman also ran. Michele Bachmann won the general election on November 2, 2010, by a margin of 52% to 38%.

Democratic primary

Candidates
 Tarryl Clark, State Senator since 2006, and assistant majority leader of the Minnesota State Senate
 Maureen Kennedy Reed, physician

Results

Independence Party primary

Candidates
 Bob Anderson

Results

Republican primary

Candidates
 Michele Bachmann, incumbent U.S. Representative since 2007

Results

General election

Polling
Bachmann vs. Clark

Bachmann vs. Reed

Results

External links
Race ranking and details from CQ Politics
Campaign contributions from OpenSecrets
Race Profile at The New York Times
Michele Bachmann for Congress incumbent
Tarryl Clark for Congress
Maureen Reed for Congress
Bob Anderson for Congress, PVS
Aubrey Immelman for Congress, PVS

District 7

Democrat Collin Peterson ran for re-election in the 7th district, which CQ Politics rated as 'Safe'. Peterson won the general election on November 2, 2010, 55%-38%.

Democratic primary

Candidates
 Collin Peterson, incumbent U.S. Representative since 1991
 Alan Roebke

Results

Independence Party primary

Candidates
 Glen R. Menze

Results

Republican primary

Candidates
 Lee Byberg, business executive

Results

General election

Results

External links
Race ranking and details from CQ Politics
Campaign contributions from OpenSecrets
Race Profile at The New York Times

District 8

Jim Oberstar lost his bid for a 19th term on November 2, 2010, to Republican Chip Cravaack. Cravaack won 48% of the vote to Oberstar's 47%. CQ Politics had rated the seat as 'Likely Democratic'.

Democratic primary

Candidates
 W. D. (Bill) Ham
 James L. Oberstar, incumbent U.S. Representative since 1975

Results

Independence Party primary

Candidates
 Timothy Olson

Results

Republican primary

Candidates
 Chip Cravaack, former Northwest Airlines pilot

Results

General election

Polling

Results

External links
Race ranking and details from CQ Politics
Campaign contributions from OpenSecrets
Race Profile at The New York Times

References

External links
Elections & Voting from the Minnesota Secretary of State
Official candidate list
2010 General election results
2010 Primary elections results
2010 Candidate filings
U.S. Congress candidates for Minnesota at Project Vote Smart
Minnesota U.S. House from OurCampaigns.com
Campaign contributions for Minnesota congressional races from OpenSecrets
2010 Minnesota General Election graph of multiple polls from Pollster.com
Campaign 2010 at Minnesota Public Radio News

2010
Minnesota
2010 Minnesota elections